Cristina Wistari Formaggia (27 August 1945 in Milan – 19 July 2008 in Milan) was an Italian actress, performer and artist who came to be a key participant in the preservation and dissemination of Balinese dance – particularly the Topeng and Gambuh traditions; she was also a student of the Indian Kathakali school of sacred performance art. She was heavily involved in contemporary trans-cultural theatre being both an active participant in the ISTA in collaboration with Eugenio Barba and the Odin Teatret (serving as its link to Bali) and with the Magdalena Project.

Biography timeline

1945 – Born in Milan, Italy.
1970s – She studied Kathakali, a South Indian dance drama, for two years in the southern Indian state of Kerala; she worked with one of the established masters of this art form, Guru Gopinath.
1983 – First arrival in Bali to recover from a severe car accident in Australia; captivated by Balinese dance, she studied under great master I Made Jimat of Batuan. She would later join his troupe, tour Bali with them and teach workshops with him around the world.
1992 – Cristina spearheads the foundation of the Gambuh Preservation Project with help from the Ford Foundation.
1995 – Beginning of Collaboration with ISTA and Eugenio Barba.
1999 – Release of the Music of Gambuh Theater CD with proceeds going toward the Gambuh Preservation Project.
1999 – Founded Topeng-Shakti, an all-female troupe to promote empowerment through the arts for women; traveled with them to Paris for performances and workshops in 2000 and 2001.
2000 – Published Drama Tari Bali via Yayasan Lontar publishers of Jakarta in Indonesian.
2004 – Published "Il Gambuh, un archetipo delle arti sceniche balinesi", Teatro e Storia, n°24, Editions Bulzoni in Italian, January/February 2004
2006 – Performed Hamlet infused with traditional Gambuh influences in collaboration with Eugenio Barba in Denmark.
2008 – Took the Pura Desa Batuan troupe to Europe to perform in a collaboration with Eugenio Barba's ISTA's production of The Marriage of Medea a month before she suddenly died.

See also
 List of dancers

References 
Nathalie Gauthard : De rives en rivages, le dernier voyage de Cristina Wistari, Revue L'Ethnographie n°4 2009 http://livre.fnac.com/a1481979/Collectif-Revue-L-Ethnographie

External links 
http://www.culturebase.net/artist.php?3107
https://web.archive.org/web/20080614224055/http://www.odinteatret.dk/workshops_and_events_at_odin/festuge/2008/jasonite_family_workshop_may_june_2008.htm
http://journals.cambridge.org/action/displayAbstract;jsessionid=6B3987F6ACA8046D3BEC896514679431.tomcat1?fromPage=online&aid=1871528
https://web.archive.org/web/20080505190951/http://www.odinteatret.dk/productions/current_productions/ur-hamlet.htm
https://web.archive.org/web/20110711022346/http://www.francescaguillen.com/teatro/the-medea-marriage/63-medeas-bryllup-odin-teatre.html
https://web.archive.org/web/20110728102350/http://www.themagdalenaproject.org/archive/cristina_wistari.htm
https://web.archive.org/web/20100206232424/http://blog.baliwww.com/dance-drama-music/1534
http://www.theatre-du-soleil.fr/thsol/sources-orientales/les-sources-orientales/bali/elements-de-bibliographie-574
https://books.google.com/books?id=RzUPfuQ1GO0C&pg=PP173&lpg=PP173&dq=Gambuh+Preservation+Project&source=bl&ots=LYsH_dNUxd&sig=ZCsjcM3qxgW-LpXmp1xvWCh0wwI&hl=en&ei=8kOpS_m5LcKBlAfOwsixDw&sa=X&oi=book_result&ct=result&resnum=10&ved=0CCAQ6AEwCQ#v=onepage&q=Gambuh%20Preservation%20Project&f=false
https://web.archive.org/web/20171005073155/http://gambuhdesabatuanensemble.com/
http://www.amazon.ca/Music-Gambuh-Theater-Ensemble-Batuan/dp/B00000K4JY

Italian performance artists
Italian stage actresses
Actresses from Milan
1945 births
2008 deaths
Italian female dancers
Musicians from Milan
20th-century Italian actresses
21st-century Italian actresses
20th-century Italian musicians